Paulette R. Dillard is an American academic administrator and medical technologist. She is the 18th president of Shaw University.

Early life 
Dillard is from Mount Airy, North Carolina. She graduated from Barber–Scotia College and completed a M.B.A. at Belmont University. Dillard earned a M.S. in biology at Tennessee State University. She completed a Ph.D. in cell biology at Clark Atlanta University.

Career 
Dillard began her career at International Clinical Laboratories in Nashville, Tennessee. She was a scientist for 25 years in the field of diagnostic laboratory medicine. She is a medical technologist certified by the American Society for Clinical Pathology. She held leadership positions at GlaxoSmithKline, Quest Diagnostics, and the Center for Cancer Research and Therapeutic Development at Clark Atlanta University. Dillard served as vice president for academic affairs and dean of the college of arts and sciences at Shaw University. She became interim president in July 2017. On September 8, 2018, she succeeded Tashni-Ann Dubroy as the 18th president of Shaw University.

See also 

 List of women presidents or chancellors of co-ed colleges and universities

References 

Living people
Year of birth missing (living people)
People from Mount Airy, North Carolina
Barber–Scotia College alumni
Belmont University alumni
Tennessee State University alumni
Clark Atlanta University alumni
Clark Atlanta University faculty
Shaw University faculty
Women heads of universities and colleges
American academic administrators
American women biologists
20th-century American biologists
21st-century American biologists
African-American scientists
20th-century American women scientists
21st-century American women scientists
Heads of universities and colleges in the United States
African-American women academics
American women academics
African-American academics